Victoria University Uganda (VUU), also known as Victoria University Kampala, is a university in Uganda, accredited by the Uganda National Council for Higher Education (UNCHE). It offers short, professional, diploma, undergraduate and postgraduate courses.

Location
VUU's main campus is located at Victoria Towers, 1-13 Jinja Road, in the central business district of Kampala, the capital and largest city of Uganda. The coordinates of VUU are 0° 18' 48.60"N, +32° 35' 21.00"S (Latitude:0.3135000; Longitude:32.589167). Plans are underway to relocate the main campus of VUU to a more spacious location in the future.

History
VUU was established in 2011 by Edulink Holdings Limited, a private company that invests internationally in tertiary institutions of higher education. From 2011 until late 2012, VUU was affiliated with the University of Buckingham (UB) in the United Kingdom, which awarded the majority of degrees offered at VUU. VUU, however, has developed a number of courses that it teaches and examines independently of UB. The degree certificates of the VUU courses are awarded by VUU. VUU was accredited by the Uganda National Council for Higher Education in October 2010. In 2012, the affiliation with UB was terminated.

In September 2013, VUU was purchased for an undisclosed sum by Sudhir Ruparelia, ranked the wealthiest individual in East Africa, by Forbes magazine in 2012. VUU then became a member of the Ruparelia Group. Its campus relocated to Eagen Mansions, at 1-13 Jinja Road, in Kampala's central business district, which was renamed "Victoria Towers".

University leadership

Academics
As of July 2014, VUU consisted of four faculties:
 Faculty of Business and Management
 Faculty of Science and Technology
 Faculty of Humanities and Social Sciences
 Faculty of Health Sciences
Petroleum and Energy Studies

Undergraduate programmes
As of December 2018, Victoria University offered the following undergraduate courses:

Faculty of Business and Management
 Bachelor of Business Administration - 3 years
Bachelor of Banking and Finance - 3 years
Bachelor of Tourism and Hospitality Management - 3 years
Bachelor of International Business - 3 years
Bachelor of Science in Oil and Gas Accounting - 3 years
Diploma in Procurement and Logistics - 2 years
Diploma in Banking and Finance - 2 years
Diploma in Business Administration - 2 years
Diploma in Tourism and Hospitality - 2 years

Faculty of Science and Technology
 Bachelor of Computer Science - 3 years
 Bachelor of Business in Information Systems - 3 years
 Bachelor of Information Technology - 3 years
Diploma in Business Information Systems - 2 years
Diploma in Information Technology - 2 years

Faculty of Humanities and Social Sciences
 Bachelor of Public Administration and Management - 3 years
 Bachelor of Social Work and Social Administration - 3 years
 Bachelor of Journalism and Media Studies - 3 years
 Bachelor of Human Resource Management - 3 years
 Bachelor of International Relations and Diplomatic Studies - 3 years
Foundation Programme
Higher Education Certificate in Biological Science

Faculty of Health of Sciences
Bachelor of Science in Public Health - Full Time: 4 years
Bachelor of Environmental Health - 3 years
Bachelor of Nursing Science - 4 years
Bachelor of Midwifery Science - 3 years
Bachelor of Science in Human Nutrition and Dietetics - 4 years.
Masters of Science in Public Health

Postgraduate programmes 
 Master of Business Administration (MBA)
 Master of Arts in Public Administration and Management (MA-PAM)

Developments
The university held its first graduation ceremony at Kabira Country Club, during the summer of 2014. Twenty-two graduates were awarded degrees and diplomas. In December 2021, the Uganda National Council of Higher Education (UNCHE), granted Victoria University Uganda with a University Charter provided certain precedents are met. These precedents were met in July 2022 when the university received its Charter Certificate, duly signed by The President of Uganda.

See also
 :Category:Academic staff of Victoria University Uganda
 :Category:Victoria University Uganda alumni
 List of universities in Uganda
 Ugandan university leaders
 Education in Uganda

References

External links

Excitement as Victoria University visits South Sudan - 21 December 2015

Victoria University Uganda
Educational institutions established in 2011
Education in Kampala
Kampala Central Division
2011 establishments in Uganda
Ruparelia Group